The following are the national records in athletics in Singapore maintained by Singapore Athletics (SA).

Outdoor

Key to tables:

h = hand timing

+ = en route to a longer distance

a = aided road course

Men

Women

Mixed

Indoor

Men

Women

Notes

References
General
Singaporean Records 22 January 2023 updated
Specific

External links
 SAA web site

Singapore
Records
Athletics
Athletics